Mir Jafar Abbas oghlu Baghirov (17 September 1896 – 7 May 1956) was the communist leader of the Azerbaijan SSR from 1932 to 1953, under the Soviet leadership of Joseph Stalin.

Early life
Born in Quba of Baku Governorate in 1896, Baghirov studied pedagogy in Petrovsk.
During 1915–1917, M J. Baghirov worked as a school teacher in a village in Khudat. He joined the Bolsheviks in March 1917 and was elected deputy chairman of the Quba revolutionary committee. During 1918 - 1921, he participated in the October Revolution and Russian Civil War in ranks of a commander of regiment, military commissar of Azerbaijani division, advisor of the Caucasus corps of the Russian military command, and the head of revolutionary tribunal of Azerbaijani division. After the Soviet takeover of Azerbaijan, Baghirov was appointed the Chairman of the Revolutionary Committee of Karabakh region of Azerbaijan. It was reported that Baghirov worked also for the Azerbaijan Democratic Republic's police. In February 1921, he joined Cheka, later renamed the Ogpu. In 1927–29, he served as the director of Department for Water Distribution of Transcaucasia. In December 1929 to August 1930, Baghirov was the head of state security services in Azerbaijan.

Relationship with Beria 
In 1921, one of Baghirov's subordinates in Cheka was the young Lavrentiy Beria, whose career he sponsored. Beria repaid him when he was appointed overlord of the three Transcaucasian republics (Azerbaijan, Armenia and Georgia) in 1932, first by arranging for Baghirov to be appointed the 'responsible instructor' of the Central Committee of the Communist Party of the Soviet Union in Azerbaijan, and then the boss of the Azerbaijan communist party. According to Beria's son, Sergo:

First Secretary of Communist Party
Baghirov was the first secretary of the Central Committee of the Azerbaijan Communist Party from December 1933 to April 1953. He was the only regional party boss apart from Andrei Zhdanov in Leningrad to remain in office throughout the Great Purge, during which more than 10,000 people in Azerbaijan were shot on a charge of plotting to assassinate Baghirov. In October 1937, he was raised to full membership of the Central Committee of the Communist Party of the Soviet Union after a clutch of incumbents had been denounced as 'enemies of the people'.

On 7 March 1953, just after the death of Joseph Stalin, Baghirov was appointed a candidate member of the Praesidium (Politburo) of the Central Committee, which means that he was officially the most senior communist official based in any of the smaller Soviet republics outside Russia. On 21 April, he transferred himself to the post of chairman of the Council of Ministers of the Azerbaijan SSR, but on 19 July was sacked, in the wake of the arrest of Beria.

Trial and Execution 
Baghirov was arrested in  1954, and charged with having been a bandit during the Russian Civil War, with having been responsible for the deaths of a large number of senior Azerbaijani communists during the Great Purge, including Gazanfar Musabekov, Huseyn Rahmanov. Hamid Sultanov, Ayna Sultanova and many more, and of "being one of the most active and intimate accomplices of the traitor Beria." He was tried with five others at a special sessions of the Military Collegium of the USSR Supreme Court in Baku on 12–26 April 1956. In his final 17-minute speech before the court, he favored the sentence and refused to apply for any pardon. Baghirov was executed in 1956.

Mir Jafar Baghirov is a controversial figure in Azerbaijani history. By 1940 an estimated 70,000 Azeris had died as a result of purges carried out under Baghirov. The intelligentsia was decimated, broken, and eliminated as a social force and the old guard Communist elite was destroyed. However, Baghirov was also successful in resisting the Armenian demands to cede the Nagorno-Karabakh Autonomous Oblast of the Azerbaijan SSR to the Armenian SSR.

He was credited for treating his junior son as an ordinary Soviet citizen. Baghirov sent his son, Vladimir (Jahangir) Baghirov, a military pilot, to the Soviet Army to fight against Nazi Germany. He was killed in battle in June 1943, after performing an aerial ramming.

Honours and awards
 Order of the Red Banner (twice)
 Five Orders of Lenin 
 Order of the Red Banner of Labor (twice) 
 Order of the Red Banner of the Azerbaijan SSR
 Order of the Patriotic War

References

External links

 M.J.Baghirov biography
"Hey Ismayil, Make Him Understand" (1962). A Satire about Mir Jafar Baghirov by Azerbaijani writer Mir Jalal.

1896 births
1956 deaths
20th-century Azerbaijani educators
People from Quba
People from Baku Governorate
Azerbaijani atheists
Azerbaijani revolutionaries
Bolsheviks
First secretaries in national subdivisions of the Soviet Union
Executed politicians
Executed Soviet people from Azerbaijan
Party leaders of the Soviet Union
Executed Azerbaijani people
Azerbaijani people executed by the Soviet Union
People of the Russian Civil War
People of the Russian Revolution
Azerbaijani educators
Politburo of the Central Committee of the Communist Party of the Soviet Union candidate members
Central Committee of the Communist Party of the Soviet Union members
First secretaries of the Azerbaijan Communist Party
Recipients of the Order of Lenin
Recipients of the Order of the Red Banner
Recipients of the Order of the Red Banner of Labour
First convocation members of the Soviet of the Union
Second convocation members of the Supreme Soviet of the Soviet Union
Third convocation members of the Supreme Soviet of the Soviet Union
Heads of the government of the Azerbaijan Soviet Socialist Republic
Deaths by firearm in Azerbaijan
Great Purge perpetrators
Members of the Communist Party of the Soviet Union executed by the Soviet Union